Claudia del Carmen Di Girolamo Quesney (born December 30, 1956 in Santiago de Chile), is a Chilean actress and theater director of Italian descent, who has a prominent and distinguished artistic career in theater, film and television. Considered one of the best actress of the performing arts in the history of Chilean television. 

In the 1990s, with the return of democracy in his country, she began the most successful period of his career, leading the first super-productions in the history of Chilean television, in the midst of Golden Age of television series, between the 1990s and 2000s, with titles such as Trampas y Caretas (1992), Estupido Cupido (1995), Oro Verde (1997), Iorana (1998), La Fiera (1999), Romané (2000), Pampa Ilusión (2001), El circo de las Montini (2002), Puertas Adentro (2003), and Los Pincheira (2004).

She was married to fellow actor Cristián Campos. Her current spouse since 1996 is telenovela director, and a TVN executive, Vicente Sabatini.

Filmography

Televisión

Theater 
 1976 - The House of Bernarda Alba
 1976 - Seximental Education 
 1978 - Loyola, Loyola
 1979 - Zero on Left
 1981 - Glass Roof
 1982 - Salome
 1984 - Last Edition
 1987 - A Very Special Day
 1990 - Fool for Love
 1992 - King Lear
 1993 - El Vacio Absurdo
 1994 - Le Malentendu
 1995 - La Catedral de la Luz
 1998 - Madame de Sade
 1999 - Fedra
 2000 - The Heredity
 2001 - Medea
 2003 - The Son
 2004 - Psicosis 4.48 (Monologue of three characters)
 2006 - Roberto Zucco
 2007 - Hedda Gabler
 2008 - Las Brutas
 2009 - Orlando
 2010 - Almedi, The Fool
 2011 - A Doll's House
 2013 - The Sea On The Wall
 2013 - Trovarsi
 2015 - The Tempest
 2017 -  Lady Marginal
 2017 - White Rabbit. Red Rabbit
 2017 - The Glass Menagerie
 2020 - La Taguada
 2020 - Cannibal
 2020 - King Lear
 2021 - Las Brutas
 2022 - Oleaje

External links 
 Especial fotográfico de Claudia Di Girolamo en TVN.cl

1956 births
Living people
Chilean film actresses
Chilean television actresses
Chilean telenovela actresses
Chilean people of Italian descent
Actresses from Santiago
University of Chile alumni